John Berman (born March 21, 1972) is an American news anchor, formerly the co-anchor of CNN's New Day with Brianna Keilar on CNN, and a regular relief presenter of Anderson Cooper 360°. Having been a weekday relief co-anchor of CNN's New Day early morning news program for several years, he replaced Chris Cuomo as its regular co-anchor, following Cuomo's departure on May 24, 2018, to present Cuomo Prime Time.

Early life and education
Berman was educated at Phillips Academy Andover, an independent co-educational, boarding and day, university-preparatory school in the town of Andover in Massachusetts, which he left in 1990, followed by Harvard University, from which he graduated summa cum laude with a Bachelor of Arts degree in social studies. Berman is of Sephardic Jewish descent.

Career
After leaving Harvard, Berman joined ABC News in a junior office post, rising to become Chief Writer for Peter Jennings, the long-term newscaster of ABC World News Tonight. After the inauguration of President George W. Bush, Berman was assigned to cover the White House. After six months, he asked to be reassigned to New York. On his first week in the job, the towers of the World Trade Center were destroyed in the September 11 attacks. Then, as a general assignment reporter, Berman reported from Iraq, embedded with a Marine infantry battalion at the beginning of the war in al-Nasiriyah as an on-air correspondent. He says, “It was an incredible personal experience, absolutely terrifying, risky and physically grueling. As a reporter, you always want to be covering the biggest stories, despite the risks".

On September 15, 2022, it was announced that Berman will leave his role on New Day with Brianna Keilar later this year. He will continue to co-anchor the show until the new CNN revamped morning show debuts. He will be assigned a new anchor role at the network.

In January 2023, CNN announced plans to revamp its daytime programming, Berman will co-anchor with Kate Bolduan and Sara Sidner from 9 a.m. until noon on their new program in Spring 2023.

Jeopardy!
Berman appeared in a celebrity Jeopardy! episode  on May 13, 2015. He defeated other celebrity contestants Mo Rocca and Wendi McLendon-Covey to win $50,000 for his charity.

Personal life
Berman is married to Kerry Voss; they have two sons. They live in Armonk, New York.

See also
 New Yorkers in journalism

References

External links

John Berman profile

1972 births
Living people
Harvard University alumni
Phillips Academy alumni
American television news anchors
American Sephardic Jews
American television reporters and correspondents
CNN people
People from Carlisle, Massachusetts